Christian Fagan (born 23 June 1961) is a former Australian rules footballer who is the senior coach of the Brisbane Lions in the Australian Football League (AFL). He spent his entire playing career in Tasmania, playing 263 senior games with Hobart, Sandy Bay, and Devonport. Before being appointed head coach of Brisbane in October 2016, Fagan had spent long periods as an assistant coach at Melbourne (1999–2007) and Hawthorn (2008–2016).

Playing career
Fagan was born in Queenstown, Tasmania. He played 263 senior games in the Tasmanian Australian National Football League (TANFL) and Tasmanian Football League (TFL) with Hobart, Sandy Bay and Devonport and kicked 430 goals in his career. He represented Tasmania on 11 occasions and played in two Premiership teams – Hobart in 1980 and Devonport in 1988.

Coaching career

Tasmania
Fagan spent two years as an assistant coach at North Hobart before being appointed senior coach of Sandy Bay for 1993 and 1994. He was the inaugural coach of the Tassie Mariners from 1995 to 1997. He was the 181st person to be inducted into the Tasmanian Football Hall of Fame in 2007.

AFL

Melbourne Football Club assistant coach (1999-2007)

Hawthorn Football Club assistant coach and general manager of football (2008-2016)
He served two roles at the Hawthorn Football Club between 2008 and 2016, where he was instrumental in the club's 2008, 2013, 2014 and 2015 premiership victories. He was head of coaching and development between 2008 and mid-2013, while he was also the general manager of football alongside senior coach Alastair Clarkson between mid-2013 and the end of 2016.

In September 2022, following his departure from the club, he was alleged to have been involved in the isolation and separation of indigenous players from their partners and families, allegations which came to light as part of an external review into historical racism commissioned by Hawthorn. Investigations into the allegations are ongoing.

Brisbane Lions senior coach (2016–present)
On 4 October 2016, Fagan was appointed as the senior coach of the Brisbane Lions, replacing Justin Leppitsch. He is one of the few AFL coaches appointed in recent years without AFL playing experience.  Fagan took the Lions to the finals in his third season as coach and was subsequently honoured by the AFL Coaches Association with the 2019 Allan Jeans Senior Coach of the Year Award, although the Lions fell short of expectations, succumbing to a heart-breaking three-point Semi-Final defeat to GWS at the Gabba. Fagan would then take the Lions to the finals in the subsequent 2020, 2021 and 2022 seasons, but did not reach the Grand Final in any of those seasons, falling short in two Preliminary Finals defeats, both to the Geelong Cats, and a Semi-Final defeat to the Western Bulldogs. 

On the 4th of March, 2023, the Lions announced that Fagan had signed a contract extension that would keep him at the club until the 2025 season.

Head coaching record

Honours and achievements

Playing honours
Team
 TANFL premiership player (Hobart): 1980
 TFL Statewide League premiership player (Devonport): 1988

Individual
 Tasmanian Football Hall of Fame (2007 Inductee)

Coaching honours
Individual
 AFLCA Allan Jeans Senior Coach of the Year Award: 2019

References

1961 births
Brisbane Lions coaches
Living people
Hobart Football Club players
Sandy Bay Football Club players
Devonport Football Club players
Sandy Bay Football Club coaches
People from Tasmania
Australian rules footballers from Tasmania
Tasmanian Football Hall of Fame inductees